Rosebery School is an all-girls school located in Epsom, Surrey. It consists of a lower school for those aged between 11 and 16, and a sixth form for those aged between 16 and 18. The school has academy status. It is situated close to the A24, and is a 10 to 15-minute walk from Epsom town centre and Epsom railway station.

History
Rosebery School sits on an area of land given to the borough by Lord Rosebery, along with the nearby Rosebery Park. It is the product of the amalgamation of 'Rosebery Grammar School for Girls and Epsom County School for Girls. It was founded in 1927 and became an academy on 1 December 2011.

Houses
At Rosebery, pupils are organised into different houses: Malala, Elizabeth, Pankhurst and Curie.  When a new pupil joins she is placed in a house, remaining part of it throughout her time at the school. Pupils who already have a sister in the school join the house to which their sister already belongs.
The houses names changed in 2016 to that of inspirational women. They were formerly Diamond, Sapphire, Ruby and Emerald.

Uniform
All girls in the lower school, Years 7–11, wear a uniform consisting of a kilt and navy blue jumper bearing a red primrose in recognition of the family name of Lord Rosebery. The school was opened by Lord Rosebery on his birthday and he gave permission for his name to be used for the school. Lord Rosebery, born Archibald Primrose, succeeded to the title of 5th Earl of Rosebery and was married to Hannah, heiress daughter of Baron Mayer de Rothschild; it is said that their family tartan was used for the initial uniform. Current Sixth formers do not wear a uniform, but must wear appropriate clothing, with no extremes of fashion allowed. Girls will also, depending on which house they belong to, wear a coloured badge with the logo of Rosebery School.

Specialist status
In 2006, Rosebery was awarded specialist status for Mathematics and ICT.

Notable alumni

Rosebery Grammar School for Girls
 Jackie Ashley, Guardian journalist and broadcaster.
 Peta Buscombe, Baroness Buscombe, Chairman of the Press Complaints Commission 2009–11 and previously Chief Executive of the Advertising Association 2007-9
 Alex Kingston, actress, ER and Doctor Who.
 Daphne Padden (1927-2009), graphic designer.
 Nuala Scarisbrick, co-founder and National Administrator of Life.

Rosebery School for Girls 

 Tanya Boniface, actress, singer, and member of The 411.

References

External links
 Official School Website
 EduBase

Girls' schools in Surrey
Academies in Surrey
Secondary schools in Surrey
Epsom